Fernando Tómas Lazcano Barros (born 10 November 1988) is a Chilean footballer who last played for Primera B de Chile club Cobreloa as a midfielder.

References

External links
 
 Fernando Lazcano at playmakerstats.com (English version of ceroacero.es)

1988 births
Living people
People from Quillota Province
Chilean people of Basque descent
Chilean footballers
Chilean expatriate footballers
C.D. Huachipato footballers
Deportes Concepción (Chile) footballers
Unión La Calera footballers
Naval de Talcahuano footballers
Curicó Unido footballers
Deportes Iquique footballers
Deportes Temuco footballers
C.D. Trofense players
FC Lusitanos players
Ñublense footballers
Cobreloa footballers
Chilean Primera División players
Primera B de Chile players
Primera Divisió players
Chilean expatriate sportspeople in Portugal
Chilean expatriate sportspeople in Andorra
Expatriate footballers in Portugal
Expatriate footballers in Andorra
Association football midfielders